Sir Peter Ogden  (born 1940) is an English businessman who is one of the founders of Computacenter, one of the United Kingdom's largest computer businesses.

Education

Ogden was born in Rochdale, England. He was educated at Rochdale Grammar School (now Balderstone Technology College). He was awarded a scholarship to University College, Durham in 1965, where he received a BSc in Physics (1968) and a PhD in Theoretical Physics (1971). He continued his education at Harvard Business School, receiving an MBA in Business Studies in 1973.

Career
Ogden's early career was with investment banks, notably Merrill Lynch and Morgan Stanley (where he was a Managing Director).

In 1981, he founded Computacenter with Philip Hulme, acting as Chairman of the company until 1998, when he became a non-executive director.

He established a charitable foundation to pursue his philanthropic interests — The Ogden Trust had an annual expenditure of £1,118,224 in 2006–7.

He was knighted in the 2005 New Year Honours List.

In 1996 Ogden was leaseholder of the Channel Island of Jethou.

Ogden co-owns MotorSport Vision with former Formula One driver Jonathan Palmer. The outfit runs Leicestershire's Donington Park circuit and Ogden's stake in the company is worth £12.5 million.

References

External links
Ogden Trust website

1940 births
Living people
Knights Bachelor
People from Rochdale
Alumni of University College, Durham
Harvard Business School alumni